is a 1954 black-and-white Japanese film directed by Kiyoshi Saeki and produced by Nikkatsu.

It is one of seven films about Kutsukake Tokijirō.

Cast 
 Shōgo Shimada (島田正吾) as Kutsukake Tokijirō

References

External links 
 http://www.allcinema.net/prog/show_c.php?num_c=136413

Japanese black-and-white films
1954 films
Films directed by Kiyoshi Saeki
Nikkatsu films
1950s Japanese films